Ulanovka is a rural locality (a village) in Turgenevskoye Rural Settlement, Melenkovsky District, Vladimir Oblast, Russia. The population was 4 as of 2010. There are 2 streets.

Geography 
Ulanovka is located 25 km northeast of Melenki (the district's administrative centre) by road. Novenkaya is the nearest rural locality.

References 

Rural localities in Melenkovsky District